Hedevig Rasmussen (later Gjørling, later Jensen, 21 April 1902 – 15 April 1985) was a Danish freestyle swimmer who competed in the 1924 Summer Olympics. She was born in Copenhagen and died in Lundtofte, Hovedstaden.

In 1924 she was a member of the Danish relay team which finished fourth in the 4×100 metre freestyle relay competition. In the 400 metre freestyle event she was eliminated in the semi-finals and in the 100 metre freestyle event she was eliminated in the first round.

References

External links
 
 

1902 births
1985 deaths
Danish female swimmers
Olympic swimmers of Denmark
Swimmers at the 1924 Summer Olympics
Danish female freestyle swimmers
Swimmers from Copenhagen